Leon Neil Thurgood is a retired United States Army lieutenant general who last served as the director of Hypersonics, Directed Energy, Space, and Rapid Acquisition of the Office of the Assistant Secretary of the Army for Acquisition, Logistics, and Technology. He previously served as the Special Assistant to the Assistant Secretary of the Army for Acquisition, Logistics, and Technology.

Thurgood is a member of the Church of Jesus Christ of Latter-day Saints. His father, Leon Thurgood, was also an officer in the United States military. Most of the time he was growing up he lived in various countries in Europe. Thurgood began his education at Brigham Young University and served a mission for the Church in the England Birmingham Mission. He then entered the United States military as an enlisted man. He later studied at the University of Utah where he was part of the ROTC. He has a doctorate in strategic planning and organizational behavior from the University of Sarasota.

Thurgood retired from active duty in 2022.

References

External links
 

Living people
Place of birth missing (living people)
Recipients of the Defense Superior Service Medal
Recipients of the Legion of Merit
University of Utah alumni
Brigham Young University alumni
American Latter Day Saints
University of South Florida alumni
United States Army generals
United States Army personnel of the Gulf War
United States Army personnel of the War in Afghanistan (2001–2021)
Year of birth missing (living people)